Midnight Madness may refer to: 

 Midnight Madness (basketball), an annual American college basketball event

Music
 Midnight Madness (album), a 1983 album by Night Ranger
 "Midnight Madness" (song), a 2008 song by The Chemical Brothers
 "Midnight Madness", 2017 DragonForce song from Reaching into Infinity
 "Midnight Madness", 2011 Lake of Tears song from Illwill
 "Midnight Madness", 2000 Sinergy song from To Hell and Back

Television
 "Midnight Madness" (6teen), a 2005 episode of 6teen
 "Midnight Madness", 2006 season 2 episode of Most Daring
 "Midnight Madness", c.2007 season 3 episode of Being Ian
 "Midnight Madness", 2006 season 3 episode Ben 10

Films
 Midnight Madness (1980 film), a comedy
 Midnight Madness (1918 film), a silent film starring Harry von Meter
 Midnight Madness (1928 film), silent film starring Jacqueline Logan; produced by Cecil B. DeMille

Video games
Vegas Games 2000, a gambling simulation video game also known as ''Vegas Games: Midnight Madness

See also
"The Tale of the Midnight Madness", 1993 season 2 episode of Are You Afraid of the Dark?
 Witching hour (supernatural)